José Ángel Ávila Pérez (born 7 October 1956) is a Mexican politician and lawyer affiliated with the PRD. As of 2013 he served as Deputy of the LXII Legislature of the Mexican Congress representing the Federal District. He served also as Government Secretary of the Federal District during Marcelo Ebrard's administration.

References

1956 births
Living people
Politicians from Mexico City
20th-century Mexican lawyers
Party of the Democratic Revolution politicians
21st-century Mexican politicians
Universidad Iberoamericana alumni
Deputies of the LXII Legislature of Mexico
Members of the Chamber of Deputies (Mexico) for Mexico City